The Black Spider is a 1921 German silent horror film directed by Siegfried Philippi and starring Olga Engl, Hugo Flink, and Charles Willy Kayser. It is based on the novella The Black Spider by Jeremias Gotthelf. It premiered in Berlin on 8 August 1921.

Cast
In alphabetical order
Olga Engl
Hugo Flink
Charles Willy Kayser
Rudolf Klein-Rhoden
Marga Köhler
Lissi Lind
Max Ruhbeck
Joseph Römer
Ortrud Wagner

References

External links

Films of the Weimar Republic
German silent feature films
German horror films
Films directed by Siegfried Philippi
1921 horror films
German black-and-white films
Adaptations of works by Jeremias Gotthelf
Silent horror films
1920s German films